Rostam Gorgani was a mid-16th century Persian physician who lived in India.

Rostam Gorgani was the court physician of two of the rulers of the Deccan sultanates, Malik Ahmad Shah I (1490–1510) and Burhan Shah I (1510–1553), in the city of Ahmadnagar in the Deccan Plateau, India. His name indicates he was from Gorgan, Golestan, Iran.

He composed several medical treatises in Persian, the most extensive being the Zakhirai-Nizamshahi (Supplies of Nizamshah), his encyclopaedia of material medica which he compiled at the request of Sultan Nizam-Shah and named after him. Only two copies survive, one at the Manuscript Institute of the National Academy of Sciences of Azerbaijan, and the other at the National Library of Medicine of the United States.

See also
List of Iranian scientists

References

C.A. Storey, Persian Literature: A Bio-Bibliographical Survey. Volume II, Part 2: E.Medicine (London: Royal Asiatic Society, 1971), p. 244
Fateme Keshavarz, A Descriptive and Analytical Catalogue of Persian Manuscripts in the Library of the Wellcome Institute for the History of Medicine (London: Wellcome Institute for the History of Medicine, 1986), pp 274–6 no 130.

16th-century Iranian physicians
16th-century Persian-language writers
People from Gorgan